Jesenice (sometimes also Jesenice na Dolenjskem) is a settlement on the right bank of the Sava River in the Municipality of Brežice in eastern Slovenia, right on the border with Croatia. The area is part of the traditional region of Lower Carniola. During the Second World War it was one of five Slovene settlements annexed by the Independent State of Croatia. It is now included in the Lower Sava Statistical Region.

The local church is dedicated to Mary Magdalene and belongs to the Parish of Velika Dolina. It was built in the mid-16th century. It also contains Mokrice Castle, now run as a hotel and golf course.

References

External links 

Jesenice on Geopedia

Populated places in the Municipality of Brežice